The 1939–40 Cypriot Cup was the sixth edition of the Cypriot Cup. A total of 6 clubs entered the competition. It began on 14 January 1940 with the quarterfinals and concluded on 18 February 1940 with the replay final which was held at GSP Stadium. AEL won their 2nd Cypriot Cup trophy after beating Pezoporikos 3–1 in the final.

Format 
In the 1939–40 Cypriot Cup, participated all the teams of the Cypriot First Division.

The competition consisted of three knock-out rounds. In all rounds each tie was played as a single leg and was held at the home ground of the one of the two teams, according to the draw results. Each tie winner was qualifying to the next round. If a match was drawn, extra time was following. If extra time was drawn, there was a replay match.

Quarter-finals

Semi-finals

Final 

The final abandoned after the first half due to rain. A replay match was played.

Sources

Bibliography

See also 
 Cypriot Cup
 1939–40 Cypriot First Division

Cypriot Cup seasons
1939–40 domestic association football cups
1939–40 in Cypriot football